Films produced in Norway in the 1940s:

1940s

External links
 Norwegian film at the Internet Movie Database

1940s
Lists of 1940s films
Films